Grigory Andreevich Lishin (Лишин, Григорий Андреевич St Petersburg, 23 April 1854 - 15 June 1888) was a Russian poet, theatre critic and composer. He composed two operas after texts of Pushkin: Graf Nulin (after Count Nulin) and Tsigane (after The Gypsies), but was mainly known for his songs.

Selected recordings
The song "Она хохотала" (She laughed) was recorded by Chaliapin and later by Raffaele Arie.

References

1854 births
1888 deaths
Poets from the Russian Empire
Male writers from the Russian Empire
Russian male poets
Russian critics
Composers from the Russian Empire
Musicians from Saint Petersburg
19th-century composers
19th-century poets
19th-century male writers from the Russian Empire
Burials at Tikhvin Cemetery